Broad Run may refer to a place in the United States:

Streams
Broad Run (Little Muncy Creek), in Lycoming County, Pennsylvania
Broad Run (Loudoun County, Virginia), a tributary of the Potomac River
Broad Run (Maryland), a tributary of the Potomac River
Broad Run (Occoquan River), a tributary of the Occoquan River in Virginia
Broad Run (White Clay Creek), a tributary of White Clay Creek in Pennsylvania

Other places
Broad Run (conservation area), a wildland in western Virginia
Broad Run Golfer's Club, West Bradford Township, Chester County, Pennsylvania
Broad Run, Maryland, an unincorporated community in Frederick County, Maryland
Broad Run Reservoir, Nesquehoning, Carbon County, Pennsylvania
Broad Run, Virginia, a community in Fauquier County
Broad Run (VRE station), a railway station in Prince William County, Virginia
Broad Run High School, Ashburn, Loudoun County, Virginia